Amberg is an unincorporated census-designated place in Marinette County, Wisconsin, United States, in the town of Amberg. It is located on U.S. Highway 141. As of the 2010 census, its population was 180. The Amberg Historical Society operates the Amberg Historical Museum Complex which consists of the historic town hall that is on the National Register of Historic Places, the community's train depot, a 1900-era house, and the Amberg Museum.

Dave's Falls is located near Amberg.

Amberg is part of the Marinette, WI–MI Micropolitan Statistical Area.

Geography

Demographics

History
The first permanent settler in what is now Amberg was Warren Buckman (1857–1925), who established a trading post west of the Pike River in 1883. He was followed by Charles Dahl (1862–1944), a railroad surveyor, in 1884. The post office was established in 1884 with the name Pike, and the name was changed to Amberg in 1890. It is named after William Amberg (1847–1918), a Chicago businessman that created granite quarries in the area.

Images

References

External links
 Amberg Historical Museum Complex

Census-designated places in Marinette County, Wisconsin
Census-designated places in Wisconsin
Marinette micropolitan area
1883 establishments in Wisconsin